Lakhan Arjun Rawat (born 29 September 1997) is an Indian cricketer. He made his List A debut for Manipur in the 2018–19 Vijay Hazare Trophy on 19 September 2018. He made his first-class debut for Manipur in the 2018–19 Ranji Trophy on 1 November 2018.

References

External links
 

1997 births
Living people
Indian cricketers
Manipur cricketers
People from Bulandshahr